Andrzej Socharski (born 31 August 1947) is a Polish sports shooter. He competed in the mixed skeet event at the 1976 Summer Olympics.

References

1947 births
Living people
Polish male sport shooters
Olympic shooters of Poland
Shooters at the 1976 Summer Olympics
Sportspeople from Warsaw